John Bosom (fl. 1407) was an English politician.

He was a Member (MP) of the Parliament of England for Rochester in 1407. Nothing more is recorded of him.

References

Year of birth unknown
Year of death unknown
English MPs 1407
14th-century births
15th-century deaths
Place of birth unknown
Place of death unknown